The STSat-1 (Science and Technology Satellite-1), formerly known as KAISTSat-4 (Korea Advanced Institute of Science and Technology Satellite-4), is an ultraviolet telescope in a satellite. It is funded by the Korea Aerospace Research Institute (KARI), and was launched on 27 September 2003, from Plesetsk Cosmodrome by a Kosmos-3M launch vehicle, into an Earth orbit with a height between 675 and 695 km.

STSat-1 is a low-cost KAIST / Satellite Technology Research Center (SaTReC) satellite technology demonstration mission, funded by the Ministry of Science and Technology (MOST) of South Korea, a follow-up mission in the KITSAT program. STSat-1 is a South Korean astrophysical satellite that was launched by a Kosmos 3M launch vehicle from Plesetsk at 06:11:44 UTC on 27 September 2003. The 106 kg satellite carries a special UV imaging spectrograph to monitor gas clouds in the Galaxy. It will complete a full sky mapping in about a year, by scanning a one-degree strip every day. Additionally, it may also aim the telescope downward to image auroral displays.

References

External links 
 eoPortal STSat-1

Ultraviolet telescopes
Space telescopes